Victor Victorovich Bayda (born ) is a Russian linguist who specializes in Celtic and Germanic languages. He is currently a language-planning officer in the Iveragh Gaeltacht of County Kerry.

Biography
A native of Moscow, Bayda first became interested in languages at the age of thirteen. He was particularly interested in Celtic languages, and by the time he went to university
he had learnt some Welsh and Scottish Gaelic.

At Moscow State University, he studied Dutch and Irish. To order to improve his Irish, he spent one term at Trinity College Dublin. He later spent time in the Irish-speaking communities of An Spidéal and An Cheathrú Rua, and attended Acadamh na hOllscolaíochta Gaeilge.

He was a lecturer in Irish at Moscow State University for more than fifteen years, and received his doctorate from there in 2009, with a thesis entitled .

In 2019, he was appointed as a language-planning officer (or ) for the Iveragh Gaeltacht (or ) of County Kerry, with the responsibility to devise and implement a plan to revive the Irish language there. In this role, he has advocated that the Gaeltacht regions be given their own senior ministry within the Irish government.

Bayda speaks ten languages: Russian, Irish, Scottish Gaelic, Welsh, Icelandic, Swedish, English, Dutch, German, and French.

References

External links
Interview on Radio Kerry (21 February 2019)
Interview on BBC Radio Foyle (28 February 2019)
Interview on RTÉ Radio 1 (14 March 2021)

21st-century linguists
21st-century Russian educators
Academic staff of Moscow State University
Celtic studies scholars
Irish language activists
Linguists from Russia
Linguists of Germanic languages
Linguists of Indo-European languages
Linguists of Irish
Living people
Moscow State University alumni
Russian philologists
Year of birth missing (living people)